Chennai Cheetahs (CCH) is a field hockey team based in Chennai, Tamil Nadu, India, that plays in World Series Hockey. It is owned by Chennai Sports Organisers Private Limited (CSO). The team is captained by the Australian Brent Livermore and coached by the Spaniard Jose Brasa. The team's home ground is the Mayor Radhakrishnan Stadium.

Ownership

The team is owned by Chennai Sports Organisers (CSO), which is promoted by L.T. Nanwani, owner of Jubilee Granites.  The financial details of the deal have not been disclosed but sources familiar with the deal reported that the franchise would invest 120-140 million each year for a period of 15 years.

Team anthem

The team anthem was composed by the Tamil playback singer, Srinivas. The music for the song is provided by Krishna Chetan and lyrics by Kavi Varman. It is sung by Suchith Suresan, Anand Aravindakshan and Nivas.

Team composition
The team is captained by the Australian mid-fielder Brent Livermore with the former Indian coach Jose Brasa as coach.

Performance

Fixtures and results

2012

References

See also
World Series Hockey

World Series Hockey teams
Sport in Chennai
2011 establishments in Tamil Nadu
Field hockey clubs established in 2011